Simón Bolívar International Airport  is an international airport serving the city of Santa Marta, Colombia.

It is operated by Aeropuertos De Oriente S.A.S., through a concession agreement with Aerocivil. It is the international airport of Colombia with the shortest runway, 1700 meters long.

It is named in honor of Simón Bolívar, the military and political leader who played a leading role in the establishment of several South American countries as sovereign states, and who died in Santa Marta in 1830. The airport name is also currently the name of the airport in Maiquetía (Caracas), Venezuela.

History

Construction 
The construction of the Santa Marta airport was inaugurated on 8 December 1949, by the company Líneas Aéreas Nacionales, for the Magdalena Department, a modern airport that will satisfy pressing and urgent regional needs. Back in those days, the airport had exceptional location conditions since it was used to operate by water and land. The dirt track was located parallel to the sea and is built in two stages: the first 1,200 meters long and the second with an extension to 1,000. For the operation of seaplanes, there is sufficient depth.

These ships can reach about 50 meters from the airport building. The preliminary plans for the terminal building were under study and approval by the Aerocivil and once approved the LANZA Company began its construction to complete it in the shortest possible time. it was also equipped with a modern control tower with all the devices for meteorological observations. At present, the ground movement works at Simón Bolívar Airport was progressing satisfactorily, under the direction of LANZA's engineering chief, Enrique Pérez Ayala. Santa Marta has, in its airport, a key to its development and progress.

The airport was recognized as an international airport in 2007.

Viva Air Colombia Hub (2018-2019) 
In May 2018, Viva Air Colombia announced the opening of its third operational base in Santa Marta airport, which began in October 2018 and became the first airline to operate as a hub in the airport. The new hub provided connections to destinations such as Bucaramanga, Pereira & San Andrés, ended at the beginning of 2019. In August 2018, Viva Air Colombia announced an international route to Miami from Santa Marta airport, which started on 18 December 2018, the destination ended in April 2019.

Facilities

The airport has a new medical health care facility for primary services, a new check-in area, airline offices, a new food square, renovated restrooms, and indoor ATMs. Avianca, LATAM Colombia, Ultra Air, and Wingo are the only commercial carriers that operate passenger flights in this airport.

Renovation and expansion

The airport facilities were outdated and insufficient for the recent increase of tourism in Santa Marta, which had between 1.5 million and 1.7 million domestic passengers in 2016 and 2017. Renovation of the airport facilities began on 2 February 2015. The project investment had an investment of more than 109,500 million COP (US$37 million, approximately) and it took 36 months (3 years) to be completely expanded and renovated.

The underground parking lot has space for 170 cars and 44 motorcycles, five baggage carousels, and new air-conditioning systems.

It has operated since 31 May 2016.

The renovation and expansion of the airport were completed in February 2018.

Runway extension 
The airport's runway is surrounded by the beach and sea, which restricted its length. Because of the short runway, it is one of the shortest of any major airport in Colombia. Passenger and Cargo airliners have never arrived on aircraft larger than the Airbus A321 or equivalent. No wide-body passenger airliners have ever been scheduled at Santa Marta airport.

In March 2017, when Germán Vargas Lleras was the Vice President of Colombia, he stated that the extension of the runway will be extended over the sea and would cost 350,000 million COP (US$70 million, approx). The National Government would invest 200,000 million COP in the runway, with the rest invested by the Magdalena Department.

The runway will meet the minimum length requirements for the operation of wide-body aircraft and also international destinations. The runway would go over the sea from Category C3  to Category D4 .

Airlines and destinations

Passenger

Cargo

Statistics

Busiest domestic routes (2018)

Ground transportation

Public Transport
Santa Marta Airport is also easily accessible by bus, operated by SETP and STU.

Car 
Simon Bolivar Airport is located near the motorway Transversal del Caribe

Taxi 
Taxis are available at Taxicab stand located outside the Terminal.

Incidents and accidents 
On 4 August 1982, Aerotal, flight HK-2559, a Boeing 727 aircraft, landed several meters before reaching the head of the runway, bounced off the runway and lost the left main landing gear, causing the aircraft to leave the track and end up in the safety zone.
On 29 November 1982, Aerotal, flight HK-2560, a Boeing 727 aircraft, suffered a hydraulic fault and when landing, the left main wheel was retracted and the jet left the runway.
On 17 July 2007, AeroRepública flight 7330, an Embraer ERJ-190 aircraft, overshot the runway, went down an embankment, and ended up with the front end of the aircraft immersed on the ocean.
On 16 October 2022, a Cirrus Vision SF50 registered HK-5342 overran the runway, went through the airport fence, crossed the road and crashed into a tree on the north of the beach known as "Playa Dormida" . Everyone in the aircraft survived with mild injuries. There was a single fatality and 8 people injured.

In popular culture 
 The airport appears in the movie American Made, starring Tom Cruise, about an American pilot recruited by the CIA for covert operations of Colombian drug kingpin Pablo Escobar and then was a DEA informant. The movie was released on 29 September 2017.

See also
Transport in Colombia
List of airports in Colombia

References

External links 

OpenStreetMap – Simón Bolívar
OurAirports – Simón Bolívar
SkyVector – Simón Bolívar

Airports in Colombia
Buildings and structures in Magdalena Department